Upchurch Pottery was a pottery business established in 1909 in Upchurch, Kent, by the Wakely brothers.

Most of the clay used in production was taken from what is now called Springbank Farm in Poot Lane Upchurch.

In the mid-1930s it was bought by Alice Buxton Winnicott and here she manufactured her Claverdon tableware. named after her birthplace and sold in Heals, on the Tottenham Court Road, London.

References

External links
Pottery Studio - Upchurch Pottery
Upchurch Pottery and Tudor Cafe

Ceramics manufacturers of England